HMS Pictou was the American letter of marque schooner Zebra that the Royal Navy captured in 1813. The Admiralty purchased her in 1814 and she served on the North America station during the War of 1812 before the navy sold her in 1818.

Capture
On 20 April 1813 the British frigates  and  captured Zebra off the west coast of France as Zebra was sailing from Bordeaux to New York. At the time the British frigate  was in sight. Zebra carried ten guns and a crew of 38 men under the command of Captain L. Bourne.

Career
By 26 July 1814, Pictou appeared on a list of ships on the North American station, assigned to the Halifax to Nantucket sector.

In August, Pictou took part in an expedition up the Penobscot River in Maine. On the evening of 31 August, Sylph, Peruvian, and the transport Harmony, accompanied by a boat from Dragon, embarked marines, foot soldiers and a detachment from the Royal Artillery, to move up the Penobscot under the command of Captain Robert Barrie of Dragon. The objective was the American frigate , of twenty-six 18-pounder guns, which had taken refuge some 27 miles up stream at Hampden, Maine. Here Adams had landed her guns and fortified a position on the bank with fifteen 18-pounders commanding the river. Moving up the river took two days, but eventually, after the Battle of Hampden, the British were able to capture the American defenders at Bangor, though not until after the Americans had burnt Adams. The British also captured 11 other ships and destroyed six. The British lost only one man killed, a sailor from Dragon, and had several soldiers wounded.

On 8 September, Bacchante, Rifleman, Tenedos, and Pictou captured the American schooner Fox at Machias, Maine. The British took the opportunity to confiscate a quantity of meat that they loaded on to Fox before they sent her to Saint John, New Brunswick.

On 20 January 1815, Rear Admiral Sir Henry Hotham sent Pictou to Britain with the dispatches announcing the capture of the USS President on 15 January. Pictous captain at the time was Lieutenant Charles Hare.

The navy reconditioned Pictou at Portsmouth between February and April 1815. Hare commissioned Pictou in June 1815. Lieutenant James Morgan replaced Hare in September 1815.

Fate
The navy listed the schooner Picton, of 298 tons (bm), for sale at Plymouth on 11 June 1818.
The navy sold Pictou on 13 August 1818 to a Mr. Hughes.

Notes

Citations

References
Arthur, Brian (20122) How Britain Won the War of 1812: The Royal Navy's Blockades of the United States, 1812-1815. (Boydell & Brewer).  
 
Heidler, David Stephen, & Jeanne T. Heidler (2004) Encyclopedia of the War of 1812. (Naval Institute Press).  
Hare, Charles (1848) Testimonials and memorials of the services of Lieut. Charles Hare, of the Royal Navy.
 

Schooners of the Royal Navy
War of 1812 ships of the United Kingdom
Captured ships
Privateer ships of the United States
1812 ships